Amy Schumer: Growing is an American stand-up comedy special by Amy Schumer. It was recorded at the Chicago Theatre while Schumer was in the second trimester of pregnancy with her first child. The hour-long special premiered March 19, 2019 on Netflix.

Background
Schumer developed and directed the special while amidst a 60-show tour of 42 cities in the United States. On the first day she was expected to film the special, Schumer was hospitalized due to issues with hyperemesis gravidarum as she could not keep water down.

Reception
As of February 2021, 79% of the 14 reviews compiled on Rotten Tomatoes are positive. The website's critics consensus reads: "Amy Schumer's standup matures in an hour filled with concise insights into aging and matrimony, marked with only slight Growing pains as the comedian refreshes her comedic voice."

Awards and nominations

References

External links
 Amy Schumer: Growing on Netflix
 

Works by Amy Schumer
Netflix specials
Stand-up comedy concert films
2019 television specials
Schumer, Amy